Shelby Dade Foote Jr. (November 17, 1916 – June 27, 2005) was an American writer, historian and journalist. Although he primarily viewed himself as a novelist, he is now best known for his authorship of The Civil War: A Narrative, a three-volume history of the American Civil War.

With geographic and cultural roots in the Mississippi Delta, Foote's life and writing paralleled the radical shift from the agrarian planter system of the Old South to the Civil Rights era of the New South. Foote was little known to the general public until his appearance in Ken Burns's PBS documentary The Civil War in 1990, where he introduced a generation of Americans to a war that he believed was "central to all our lives."
Foote did all his writing by hand with a nib pen, later transcribing the result into a typewritten copy. While Foote's work was mostly well-received during his lifetime, it has been criticized by academics in the 21st century.

Early life
Foote was born in Greenville, Mississippi, the son of Shelby Dade Foote and his wife Lillian (née Rosenstock). Foote's paternal grandfather, Huger Lee Foote (1854–1915), a planter, had gambled away most of his fortune and assets. His paternal great-grandfather, Hezekiah William Foote (1813–99), was an American Confederate veteran, attorney, planter and state politician from Mississippi. His maternal grandfather was a Jewish immigrant from Vienna.

Foote was raised in his father's and maternal grandmother's Episcopal faith, though he attended synagogue each Saturday with his mother until the age of eleven.
 
As his father advanced through the executive ranks of Armour and Company, the family lived in Greenville, Jackson, and Vicksburg, Mississippi, as well as Pensacola, Florida and Mobile, Alabama. Foote's father died in Mobile when Foote was five years old; he and his mother moved back to Greenville to live with her sister's family. Foote was an only child, and his mother never remarried. When Foote was 15 years old, he began what would become lifelong friendships with Walker Percy and his brothers LeRoy and Phinizy Percy who'd just moved into Greenville to live with their uncle – attorney, poet, and novelist William Alexander Percy – after the death of their parents. Foote began a lifelong fraternal and literary relationship with Walker; each had great influence on the other's writing.

Other influences on Foote's writing were Tacitus, Thucydides, Gibbon and Proust. Foote would later recall that Greenville fitted with Southern stereotypes "in some fairly superficial ways and departed from them in the most important ways", noting that "There was never a lynching in Greenville; it never got swept off its feet that way. The Ku Klux Klan never made any headway, at a time when it was making headway almost everywhere else." Despite Foote's citation, Greenville was the site of at least one lynching some 30 years before Foote's time there, when in 1903, John Dennis, a black man, was accused of raping a white woman and was lynched by some white citizens of Greenville. According to EJI, at least 13 lynchings took place in Washington County, of which Greenville is the county seat, between 1877 and 1950.

Foote edited The Pica, the student newspaper of Greenville High School, and frequently used the paper to lampoon the school's principal. In 1935, Foote applied to the University of North Carolina at Chapel Hill, hoping to join with the older Percy boys, but was initially denied admission because of an unfavorable recommendation from his high school principal. He presented himself for admission anyway, and as result of a round of admissions tests, he was accepted.

In 1936 he was initiated in the Alpha Delta chapter of the Alpha Tau Omega fraternity. Interested more in the process of learning than in earning a degree, Foote was not a model student. He often skipped class to explore the library, and once he even spent the night among the shelves. He also began contributing pieces of fiction to Carolina Magazine, UNC's award-winning literary journal. Foote returned to Greenville in 1937, where he worked in construction and for a local newspaper, The Delta Democrat Times. Around this time, he began to work on his first novel. Foote's Jewish heritage led him to experience discrimination at Chapel Hill, an experience that led to his later support for the Civil Rights Movement.

In 1940 Foote joined the Mississippi National Guard and was commissioned as captain of artillery. After being transferred from one stateside base to another, his battalion was deployed to Northern Ireland in 1943. The following year, Foote was charged with falsifying a government document relating to the check-in of a motor pool vehicle he had borrowed to visit a girlfriend in Belfast, Teresa Lavery—later his first wife—who lived two miles beyond the official military limits. He was court-martialed and dismissed from the army. Foote and Lavery divorced while she was living with his mother in New Orleans, after he sent her to the U.S. on a warship convoy. After the war, Lavery married Kermit Beahan, the Nagasaki atomic bomb bombardier, in Roswell, New Mexico.

Foote came back to the United States and took a job with the Associated Press in New York City. In January 1945, he enlisted in the United States Marine Corps but was discharged as a private in November 1945, never having seen combat.

Foote returned to Greenville and took a job with a local radio station, but he spent most of his time writing. He sent a section from his first novel to The Saturday Evening Post. "Flood Burial" was published in 1946, and when Foote received a $750 check from the Post as payment, he quit his job to write full-time.

Novelist
Foote's first novel, Tournament, was published in 1949. It was inspired by his planter grandfather, who had died two years before Foote's birth. For his next novel, Follow Me Down (1950), Foote drew heavily from the proceedings of a Greenville murder trial he attended in 1941 for both the plot and characters.

Love in a Dry Season was his attempt to deal with the "so-called upper classes of the Mississippi Delta" around the time of the Great Depression. Foote often expressed great affection for this novel, which was published in 1951. In Shiloh (1952) Foote foreshadows his use of historical narrative as he tells the story of the bloodiest battle in American history to that point from the first-person perspective of seven different characters. The narrative is presented by 17 characters – Confederate soldiers Metcalf, Dade, and Polly; and Union soldiers Fountain, Flickner, with each of the twelve named soldiers in the Indiana squad given one section of that chapter. A close reading of this work reveals a very complete interlocked picture of the characters connecting with each other (Union with Union, Confederate with Confederate). The novel quickly sold 6,000 copies and received critical acclaim from reviewers. Later assessments from academic historians have been more mixed: historians Timothy S. Huebner and Madeleine M. McGrady have argued Foote "favored the South throughout the novel, portraying the Confederate cause as a fight for constitutional liberty and omitting any reference to slavery".

Jordan County: A Landscape in Narrative, was published in 1954 and is a collection of novellas, short stories, and sketches from Foote's mythical Mississippi county. September, September (1978) is the story of three white Southerners who plot and kidnap the 8-year-old son of a wealthy African American, told against the backdrop of Memphis in September 1957.

Foote freely admitted he struggled to write realistic African-American characters, and had avoided including them in his work until September, September (1978). Foote admitted that writing black characters for the novel "scared the hell out of" him. Foote, in particular, struggled to write the wealthy black character Theo Wiggins, confiding to Walker Percy that the character was one of "those bourgeois negroes, and I never really knew a single bourgeois nigger in my life."
 
Although he was not one of America's best-known fiction writers, Foote was admired by his peers—among them the aforementioned Walker Percy, Eudora Welty, and his literary hero William Faulkner, who once told a University of Virginia class that Foote "shows promise, if he'll just stop trying to write Faulkner, and will write some Shelby Foote." Foote's fiction was recommended by both The New Yorker and critics from The New York Times Book Review.

While writing his history of the war in the 1950s and 1960s, Foote was a liberal on racial issues. He supported school integration, opposed Eisenhower's hands-off approach to Southern racism and openly championed Presidents John F. Kennedy and Lyndon Johnson. Foote protested against the KKK's use of the Confederate flag, believing 'that everything they stood for was almost exactly the opposite of everything the Confederacy had stood for'. Foote was an outspoken supporter of the Civil Rights Movement in the South, arguing in 1968 that "the main problem facing the white, upper-class South is to decide whether or not the negro is a man ... if he is a man, as of course he is, then the negro is entitled to the respect an honorable man will automatically feel to an equal.”

Historian
Foote moved to Memphis in 1952. Upon completion of Jordan County: A Landscape in Narrative, he resumed work on what he thought would be his magnum opus, Two Gates to the City, an epic work he'd had in mind for years and in outline form since the spring of 1951. He had trouble making progress and felt he was plunging toward crisis with the "dark, horrible novel." Unexpectedly, he received a letter from Bennett Cerf of Random House asking him to write a short history of the Civil War to appear for the conflict's centennial. According to Foote, Cerf contacted him based on the factual accuracy and rich detail he found in Shiloh, but Walker Percy's wife Bunt recalled that Walker had contacted Random House to approach Foote. Although the novelist had no experience writing serious history, Cerf offered him a contract for a work of approximately 200,000 words.

Foote had never been trained in the traditional scholarly standards of academic historical research, which emphasized archives and footnotes. Instead he visited battlefields. He read widely, using standard biographies and campaign studies as well as recent books by Hudson Strode, Bruce Catton, James G. Randall, Clifford Dowdey, T. Harry Williams, Kenneth M. Stampp and Allan Nevins. He did not footnote his secondary sources nor use the archives but instead mined the primary sources in the 128-volume Official Records of the War of the Rebellion. Foote described himself as a "novelist-historian" who accepted "the historian’s standards without his paraphernalia" and "employed the novelist’s methods without his license." Foote deliberately avoided the use of footnotes, arguing that "they would detract from the book's narrative quality by intermittently shattering the illusion that the observer is not so much reading a book as sharing an experience". He argued that footnotes would have "totally shattered what I was doing. I didn't want people glancing down at the bottom of the page every other sentence". Foote concluded that most historians are "so concerned with finding out what happened that they make the enormous mistake of equating facts with truth...you can't get the truth from facts. The truth is the way you feel about it".

Foote worked for several weeks on an outline and decided that his plan couldn't be done to Cerf's specifications. He requested that the project be expanded to three volumes of 500,000 to 600,000 words each, and he estimated that the entire project would be done in nine years.

Upon approval for the new plan, Foote commenced writing the comprehensive three volume, 3000-page history, together entitled The Civil War: A Narrative. The individual volumes are Fort Sumter to Perryville (1958), Fredericksburg to Meridian (1963), and Red River to Appomattox (1974).

Foote supported himself during the twenty years he worked on the narrative with three Guggenheim Fellowships (1955–1960), Ford Foundation grants, and loans from Walker Percy.

Scholarly reception and Lost Cause controversies
While Foote has been praised as an engaging commentator on the Civil War, his sympathy toward Lost Cause viewpoints and his rejection of traditional scholarly standards of academic history have seen his work reappraised and criticized, as well as defended, in recent years.

Foote's work has been accused of reproducing Lost Cause fallacies. Foote lauded Nathan Bedford Forrest as "one of the most attractive men who ever walked through the pages of history" and dismissed what he characterized as "propaganda" about Forrest's role in the Fort Pillow Massacre. Foote compared Forrest to John Keats and Abraham Lincoln, and suggested that he had tried to prevent the massacre, despite evidence to the contrary.

Foote had a picture of Forrest hanging on his wall, and believed that "he's an enormously attractive, outgoing man once you get to know him and once you get to know more facts". Foote was staunchly anti-slavery, and believed that emancipation alone was insufficient to address historical wrongs done to African-Americans: "The institution of slavery is a stain on this nation's soul that will never be cleansed. It is just as wrong as wrong can be, a huge sin, and it is on our soul. There's a second sin that's almost as great and that's emancipation . . . There should have been a huge program for schools. There should have been all kinds of employment provided for them. Not modern welfare, you can't expect that in the middle of the nineteenth century, but there should have been some earnest effort to prepare these people for citizenship. They were not prepared, and operated under horrible disadvantages once the army was withdrawn, and some of the consequences are very much with us today." Foote condemned the Freedmen's Bureau, which "did, perhaps, some good work, but it was mostly a joke, corrupt in all kinds of ways." Foote's biographer has concluded that "at its best, Foote's writing dramatised tensions related to racial and regional identity. At its worst, it fell back on the social prescriptions of Southern paternalism."

Foote maintained that "the French Maquis did far worse things than the Ku Klux Klan ever did—who never blew up trains or burnt bridges or anything else," and that the First Klan "didn't even have lynchings." Foote saw slavery as a cause of the Civil War, commenting that "the people who say slavery had nothing to do with the war are just as wrong as the people who say it had everything to do with the war." Furthermore, Foote also argued that slavery was "certainly doomed to extinction" but was used "almost as a propaganda item," and that "those who wanted to exploit it could grab onto it."

He developed new respect for such disparate figures as Ulysses S. Grant, William T. Sherman, Patrick Cleburne, Edwin Stanton and Jefferson Davis. By contrast, he grew to dislike such figures as Phil Sheridan and Joe Johnston. He considered United States President Abraham Lincoln and Confederate General Nathan Bedford Forrest to be two authentic geniuses of the war. When he stated this opinion in conversation with one of General Forrest's granddaughters, she replied after a pause, "You know, we never thought much of Mr. Lincoln in my family."

While the work generated generally favorable reviews for its literary merits, Foote's efforts received pointed and strong criticisms from professional historians and scholars of slavery. Scholars criticized Foote for not including footnotes and for neglecting subjects such as economics and politics of the Civil War era, as well as the role of slavery and the participation of African Americans more generally. Foote was criticized for his lack of interest in more current historical research, and for a less firm grasp of politics than military affairs. Foote relied extensively on the work of Hudson Strode, whose sympathy for Lost Cause claims resulted in a portrait of Jefferson Davis as a tragic hero without many of the flaws attributed to him by other historians."

Foote has been described as writing "from a white Southern perspective, perhaps even with a certain bias": Radical Republicans are portrayed negatively in his work, and the name Frederick Douglass is absent from every volume of his Narrative. In 2011, the historian Annette Gordon-Reed suggested that Foote's work was powered by romantic nostalgia rather than an attempt at scholarship, with the work reflecting "the very strong mark of memory as opposed to history...the memories of that war which grew up with many white Southern males of his generation, are what power the narrative." More broadly, Chandra Manning has suggested that Foote belongs to a school of Civil War historiography that "answers 'where does slavery fit in the Union cause' by saying 'nowhere,' except maybe in the most reluctant and instrumental way". The historian Joshua M. Zeitz described Foote as "living proof that many Americans—especially those who are most interested in the Civil War—remain under the spell of a century-old tendency to mystify the Confederacy's martial glory at the expense of recalling the intense ideological purpose associated with its cause... [Foote is] living testimony to the failure of many Civil War enthusiasts and public figures to disavow the American army that fought under the rebel banner. As a nation, we remain very much under the spell of Robert E. Lee, even as we decry slavery and its legacy".

Historian John F. Marszalek reviewing volume 3 focused on the purely military history covered by Foote:
 The total effect is impressive—a massive synthesis of Civil War scholarship as presented by a master of words... Shelby Foote has written a book that, despite weaknesses, will be long considered a major interpretation of the military history of the Civil War... Twenty years of dedicated labor have resulted in a literary masterpiece which places Shelby Foote among those very few historians who are authors of major syntheses... this history will long stand with the volumes of Bruce Catton as the final word on the military history of the Civil War.

In a 1997 interview with Donald Faulkner and William Kennedy, Foote stated that he would have fought for the Confederacy, and, "What's more, I would fight for the Confederacy today if the circumstances were similar. There's a great deal of misunderstanding about the Confederacy, the Confederate flag, slavery, the whole thing. The political correctness of today is no way to look at the middle of the 19th century. The Confederates fought for some substantially good things. States' rights is not just a theoretical excuse for oppressing people. You have to understand that the raggedy Confederate soldier who owned no slaves and probably couldn't even read the Constitution, let alone understand it, when he was captured by Union soldiers and asked, 'What are you fighting for?' replied, 'I'm fighting because you're down here.' So I certainly would have fought to keep people from invading my native state."

Views on race and African-Americans 
Beyond his sympathies for the Confederacy and the description of marginalization of African-Americans within his works, Foote retained complex, patriarchal and sympathetic views of African Americans and race relations. Foote continued to develop his perception of the travesties that befell blacks in Southern life, a culture that he would later call "perhaps the most racist society in the United States." In his earlier life, Foote had claimed to know more about the life of African Americans in the South than James Baldwin: "I told some interviewer I knew a hell of a lot more about negroes than Baldwin even began to know."

Foote struggled with drawing on black characters as models for his writing; he was unable to pull from real-world examples of blacks in the 1950s without relying upon outdated stereotypes of blacks.

Speaking in 1989, Foote stated that "this black separatist movement is a bunch of junk", believing that African-Americans should model themselves on Jews, who Foote believed had a talent for making money. Foote, however, believed "the odds against" black people were to be "too great" for them to succeed in the US, as a result of "having a different color skin". Foote maintained that the KKK of the 1920s was "mostly anti-Catholic, incidentally anti-Semitic and really was not much concerned about the Negro".

Foote believed that his experience and knowledge of the South meant he understood African-American historical figures such as Nat Turner better than Northern African-American intellectuals, stating in the 1970s that "I think that I am closer to Nat Turner than James Baldwin is. I'm talking about, I am personally more like Nat Turner than James Baldwin is, even though they are both Negroes. I consider somebody out of Harlem to be very different from someone out of Tidewater Virginia". By the 1970s, Foote believed that a "Jewish intellectual movement" had come to dominate American literature.

Later life
After finishing September, September, Foote resumed work on Two Gates to the City, the novel he had set aside in 1954 to write the Civil War trilogy. The work still gave him trouble and he set it aside once more, in the summer of 1978, to write "Echoes of Shiloh," an article for National Geographic Magazine. By 1981, he had given up on Two Gates altogether, though he told interviewers for years afterward that he continued to work on it. He served on the Naval Academy Advisory Board in the 1980s.

In 1986, Foote strongly denounced the Memphis chapter of the NAACP in their campaign for the removal of the Nathan Bedford Forrest Monument in Memphis, accusing them of anti-white prejudice: "the day that black people admire Forrest as much as I do is the day when they will be free and equal, for they will have gotten prejudice out of their minds as we whites are trying to get it out of ours." Foote argued in favor of "the Confederate flag flying anywhere anybody wants to fly it at any time. If they have a referendum in a state that says ‘Take the flag down off the state capitol,’ I think they ought to take the flag down. But the flag to me represents many noble things."

In the late 1980s, Ken Burns had assembled a group of consultants to interview for his Civil War documentary. Foote was not in this initial group, though Burns had Foote's trilogy on his reading list. A phone call from Robert Penn Warren prompted Burns to contact Foote. Burns and crew traveled to Memphis in 1986 to film an interview with Foote in the anteroom of his study. In November 1986, Foote figured prominently at a meeting of dozens of consultants gathered to critique Burns' script. Burns interviewed Foote on-camera in Memphis and Vicksburg in 1987. That same year, he became a charter member of the Fellowship of Southern Writers at the University of Tennessee at Chattanooga. The Civil War historian Judkin Browning has noted that Foote's outspoken praise of Nathan Bedford Forrest in the documentary ensured "Lost Causers raised their beer mugs in salute while historians hurled their lagers at their televisions." Foote has been further criticized for repeating "plainly wrong" Lost Cause tropes in his commentary, particularly over the issue of apparently "overwhelming" Northern industrial advantage and his downplaying of the role of slavery in causing the Civil War.

Foote remained adamant that slavery was not the only cause of the Civil War, stating in 2001 that "no soldier on either side gave a damn about the slaves—they were fighting for other reasons entirely in their minds."

The Civil War historian Harold Holzer was a further critic of Foote's presentation of Forrest. "Ken Burns always looks for varied voices and he always looks for characters, and Shelby Foote was certainly a character," Holzer says. "The most amazing thing he said was that the two great geniuses of the war were Lincoln and Nathan Bedford Forrest. Foote somehow compared the great emancipator with a man who owned slaves, murdered blacks and joined the Ku Klux Klan." The historians of slavery and the Civil War era Eric Foner and Leon Litwack added to these criticisms, suggesting that Foote consistently underplayed the extent of Southern white racism, in effect treating "white southerners" as synonymous with all "southerners." Litwack concluded that "Foote is an engaging battlefield guide, a master of the anecdote, and a gifted and charming story teller, but he is not a good historian."

The extent of Foote's apparent apologia for white Southern racism and Lost Cause mythologizing was satirized in the character of Sherman Hoyle in the 2004 mockumentary C.S.A.: The Confederate States of America, a character defined by his "consistent lamenting of and apologies for the good ole days."
 
Foote professed to be a reluctant celebrity. When The Civil War was first broadcast, his telephone number was publicly listed and he received many phone calls from people who had seen him on television. Foote never unlisted his number, and the volume of calls increased each time the series re-aired. Many Memphis natives were known to pay Foote a visit at his East Parkway residence in Midtown Memphis.

Horton Foote, the playwright and screenwriter (To Kill A Mockingbird, Baby the Rain Must Fall and Tender Mercies) was the voice of Jefferson Davis in the PBS series. The two Footes are third cousins; their great-grandfathers were brothers. "And while we didn't grow up together, we have become friends; I was the voice of Jefferson Davis in that TV series", Horton Foote added proudly.

In 1992, Foote received an honorary doctorate from the University of North Carolina. In the early 1990s, Foote was interviewed by journalist Tony Horwitz for the project on American memory of the Civil War which Horwitz eventually published as Confederates in the Attic (1998). Foote was also a member of The Modern Library's editorial board for the re-launch of the series in the mid-1990s, this series published two books excerpted from his Civil War narrative. Foote also contributed a long introduction to their edition of Stephen Crane's The Red Badge of Courage giving a narrative biography of the author. He also received the 1992 St. Louis Literary Award from the Saint Louis University Library Associates.

Foote was elected to the American Academy of Arts and Letters in 1994. Also in 1994, Foote joined Protect Historic America and was instrumental in opposing a Disney theme park near battlefield sites in Virginia. Along the way, Burns asked him to return for his upcoming documentary Baseball, where he appeared in both the 2nd Inning discussing his recollections of the dynamics of the crowds in his youth and in the 5th Inning (TV series), where he gave an account of his meeting Babe Ruth.

In 1998, the author Tony Horwitz visited Foote for his book Confederates in the Attic, a meeting in which Foote declared he was "dismayed" by the "behavior of blacks, who are fulfilling every dire prophesy the Ku Klux Klan made", and that African Americans were "acting as if the utter lie about blacks being somewhere between ape and man were true". Foote emphasized that his loyalties during the 1860s would have been to white Southerners: "I’d be with my people, right or wrong." Foote also argued that freedmen had led to the failure of Reconstruction and that the Confederate flag represented "law, honour, love of country." Foote stated that he would have been willing to fight for the Confederacy: "If I was against slavery, I'd still be with the South. I'm a man, my society needs me, here I am."

In 1999, Foote received the Golden Plate Award of the American Academy of Achievement and an honorary Doctorate of Humane Letters from The College of William & Mary.  

On September 2, 2001, Shelby Foote was the focus of the C-SPAN television program In-Depth. In a 3-hour interview, conducted by C-SPAN founder Brian Lamb, Foote shows off the library of his home, working room, and writing desk, and details the writing of his books as well as taking on-air calls and emails.

Foote campaigned in the 2001 referendum on the Flag of Mississippi, arguing against a proposal which would have replaced the Confederate battle flag with a blue canton with 20 stars. Foote rejected the Confederate flag's association with white supremacy and argued "I’m for the Confederate flag always and forever. Many among the finest people this country has ever produced died in that war. To take it and call it a symbol of evil is a misrepresentation."

In 2003, Foote received the Peggy V. Helmerich Distinguished Author Award. The Helmerich Award is presented annually by the Tulsa Library Trust.

Foote died at Baptist Hospital in Memphis on June 27, 2005, aged 88. He had had a heart attack after a recent pulmonary embolism. He was interred in Elmwood Cemetery in Memphis. His grave is beside the family plot of General Forrest.

Legacy
Many reviews of The Civil War: A Narrative praised its style. However, the academic reviewers often complained about the absence of footnotes, and Foote's deliberate refusal to cover social, economic, and racial themes. The eminent Southern historian C. Vann Woodward cautioned that the academicians had themselves abdicated their most honored role:

Woodward, who wrote a best-selling naval history of the Battle of Leyte Gulf, added that, "In no field is the abdication of the professionals more evident than in military history, the strictly martial, guns-and-battle aspect of war, the most essential aspect."

In 1993, Richard N. Current argued that Foote too often depended on a single, unsupported source for lifelike details, but "probably is as accurate as most historians... Foote's monumental narrative most likely will continue to be read and remembered as a classic of its kind."

In a 2011 commentary, Ta-Nehisi Coates concluded that Foote was not guilty of "neo-Confederate apologia." However, Foote "gave twenty years of his life, and three volumes of important and significant words to the Civil War, but he could never see himself in the slave. He could not get that the promise of free bread can not cope with the promise of free hands. Shelby Foote wrote The Civil War, but he never understood it. Understanding the Civil War was a luxury his whiteness could ill-afford."

In 2013, the Sons of Confederate Veterans used Foote's presentation of Nathan Bedford Forrest as a "humane slave holder" to protest against the removal of his statue in Memphis. Foote had argued that Forrest "avoided splitting up families or selling [slaves] to cruel plantation owners."

In October 2017, John F. Kelly, the White House Chief of Staff for President Donald Trump, argued that "the lack of ability to compromise led to the Civil War." He also described Robert E. Lee as an "honorable man" who "gave up... his country to fight for his state," and claimed that "men and women of good faith on both sides made their stand where their conscience had to make their stand." In response to the ensuing controversy, the White House Press Secretary Sarah Huckabee Sanders cited the work of Foote in defense of Kelly: "I do know that many historians, including Shelby Foote in Ken Burns' famous Civil War documentary, agreed that a failure to compromise was a cause of the Civil War."

In 2017, the conservative writer Bill Kauffman, writing in The American Conservative, argued for a revival of Foote's sympathetic portrayal of the South.

On October 18, 2019, a Mississippi Writers Trail historical marker was installed in Greenville, Mississippi, to honor the literary and historical contributions of Shelby Foote.

Foote's distinctive Southern accent was the model for Daniel Craig's character in the 2019 film Knives Out.

Publications 
Many of Foote's books can be borrowed at no cost from online libraries.

Fiction
Tournament (1949)
Follow Me Down (1950)
Love in a Dry Season (1951)
Shiloh: A Novel (1952)
Jordan County: A Landscape in Narrative (1954)
"September, September" (1978)

The Civil War: A Narrative
The Civil War: A Narrative. Vol 1: Fort Sumter to Perryville (1958)
The Civil War: A Narrative. Vol 2: Fredericksburg to Meridian (1963)
The Civil War: A Narrative. Vol 3: Red River to Appomattox (1974)

Titles excerpted from The Civil War: A Narrative
Stars in Their Courses: The Gettysburg Campaign, June–July 1863
The Beleaguered City: The Vicksburg Campaign, December 1862 – July 1863

These two books published by the Modern Library are excerpted from the three-volume narrative. The former was a whole chapter in the second volume, and the latter excerpted from the second volume where some material was interspersed with other events. Both were also presented as unabridged audio books read by the author.

Other
 Foote edited a modern edition of Chickamauga And Other Civil War Stories (previously published as The Night Before Chancellorsville And Other Civil War Stories), an anthology of Civil War stories by various authors.
 Foote contributed a lengthy introduction to the 1993 Modern Library edition of Stephen Crane's The Red Badge of Courage (which was published along with "The Veteran", a short story that features the hero of the larger work at the end of his life). In this introduction, Foote recounts the biography of Crane in the same narrative style as Foote's Civil War work.
 Foote collaborated with his wife's cousin, photographer Nell Dickerson, to produce the book Gone: A Photographic Plea for Preservation. Dickerson used Foote's story "Pillar of Fire", from his 1954 novel Jordan County: A Landscape in Narrative, as the text to illustrate her photographs of southern antebellum buildings in ruins.

References

Further reading
 Chapman, C. Stuart. Shelby Foote: A Writer's Life (Univ. Press of Mississippi, 2006).
 Crews, Kyle. "An “Unreligious” Affair: (Re) Reading the American Civil War in Foote's Shiloh and Warren's Wilderness." Robert Penn Warren Studies 8.1 (2008): 9+. online
 Gordon-Reed, Annette. "History and Memory: A Critique of the Foote Vision," in Jon Meachem ed., American Homer: Reflections on Shelby Foote and his Classic the Civil War: A Narrative (Modern Library 2011)
 Grimsley, Mark. "The Greatest Bards: Part 1," The Civil War Monitor 5/18/2020 online
 Huebner, Timothy S., and Madeleine M. McGrady. "Shelby Foote, Memphis, and the Civil War in American memory." Southern Cultures 21#4 (2015), p. 13+. online
 Meachem, Jon, ed., American Homer: Reflections on Shelby Foote and his Classic The Civil War: A Narrative (Modern Library 2011) table of contents
 Mitchell, Douglas. "'The conflict is behind me now': Shelby Foote writes the Civil War." Southern Literary Journal 36#1 (2003), p. 21+. online
 Panabaker, James. Shelby Foote and the Art of History: Two Gates to the City (Univ. of Tennessee Press, 2004)
 Phillips, Robert L. Shelby Foote: Novelist and Historian (Univ. Press of Mississippi, 2009).
 Sugg, Redding S. and Helen White. Shelby Foote (Twayne Publishers, 1982)
 White, Helen, and Redding S. Sugg. Shelby Foote (Twayne Pub, 1982), focus on novels.
 Williams, Wirt. "Shelby Foote's" Civil War:" The Novelist as Humanistic Historian." The Mississippi Quarterly 24.4 (1971): 429–436.
 Woodward, C. Vann. “The Great American Butchery,”  New York Review of Books (March 6, 1975).

Primary sources
 Carter, William C., ed. Conversations with Shelby Foote, (UP of Mississippi, 1989)
 Tolson, Jay, ed. The Correspondence of Shelby Foote and Walker Percy (W.W. Norton Company, 1997). online review

External links

 "Shelby Foote Collection" Rhodes College, Memphis
 Shelby Foote Papers Inventory, in the Southern Historical Collection, UNC-Chapel Hill
 PBS Civil War
 American Enterprise interview with Bill Kauffman
 Ole Miss biography and obituary 
 Fellowship of Southern Writers biography
 Reprint of a letter from Foote to William Faulkner, Meridian, Issue 17, University of Virginia
 Shelby Foote Collection (MUM00187) owned by the University of Mississippi.
 
 In Depth interview with Foote, September 2, 2001
 
 
 

1916 births
2005 deaths
20th-century American Episcopalians
20th-century American historians
20th-century American male writers
20th-century American novelists
American male non-fiction writers
American male novelists
American military historians
American military writers
American people of Austrian-Jewish descent
Burials in Tennessee
Historians from Florida
Historians of the American Civil War
Historians of the Southern United States
Neo-Confederates
Members of the American Academy of Arts and Letters
National Humanities Medal recipients
Novelists from Alabama
Novelists from Florida
Novelists from Mississippi
Novelists from Tennessee
People from Greenville, Mississippi
People from Vicksburg, Mississippi
Pro-Confederate writers
United States Army officers
United States Marine Corps personnel of World War II
United States Marines
Writers from Jackson, Mississippi
Writers from Memphis, Tennessee
Writers from Mobile, Alabama
Writers from Pensacola, Florida